King Crimson On Broadway is a live album (2-CD set) by the band King Crimson, released through the King Crimson Collectors' Club in July 1999.  The tracks on the albums were recorded at the Longacre Theater in New York City, New York, US, on November 20, 21, 22, 24 and 25, 1995, as the band was touring to promote the album THRAK.

In 2002 King Crimson released a live album (2-CD set) entitled Vrooom Vrooom that features one disc with recordings from the Broadway concerts (as well as one disc with recordings from a concert in Mexico one year later).

The final track, "Fearless and Highly THRaKked", is also featured on the live album THRaKaTTaK (1996).  An alternative version of this track, entitled "Biker Babes of the Rio Grande", is featured on the Vrooom Vrooom live album (2001).

Lead singer and guitarist Adrian Belew performed The Beatles's "Free As A Bird" as a solo piece throughout the Broadway engagement.  This was not included on King Crimson On Broadway, but was released on Belew's solo album Belewprints and on the Vrooom Vrooom live album.

The liner notes include entries from Robert Fripp's web-diary, entered between March 4 and April 22, 1999.

Track listing

Disc 1
"Conundrum" (Adrian Belew, Bill Bruford, Robert Fripp, Trey Gunn, Tony Levin, Pat Mastelotto) - 1:57
"Thela Hun Ginjeet" (Belew, Bruford, Fripp, Levin) - 6:43
"Red" (Fripp) - 6:29
"Dinosaur" (Belew, Bruford, Fripp, Gunn, Levin, Mastelotto) - 7:16
"VROOOM VROOOM" (Belew, Bruford, Fripp, Gunn, Levin, Mastelotto) - 4:48
"Frame by Frame" (Belew, Bruford, Fripp, Levin) - 5:10
"Walking on Air" (Belew, Bruford, Fripp, Gunn, Levin, Mastelotto) - 5:28
"B'Boom" (Belew, Bruford, Fripp, Gunn, Levin, Mastelotto) - 5:35
"THRAK" (Belew, Bruford, Fripp, Gunn, Levin, Mastelotto) - 6:31
"Neurotica" (Belew, Bruford, Fripp, Levin) - 4:34
"Sex Sleep Eat Drink Dream" (Belew, Bruford, Fripp, Gunn, Levin, Mastelotto) - 4:58

Disc 2
"People" (Belew, Bruford, Fripp, Gunn, Levin, Mastelotto) - 6:14
"One Time" (Belew, Bruford, Fripp, Gunn, Levin, Mastelotto) - 5:55
"Indiscipline" (Belew, Bruford, Fripp, Levin) - 7:16
"Two Sticks" (Gunn, Levin) - 2:02
"Elephant Talk" (Belew, Bruford, Fripp, Levin) - 4:17
"Prism" (Pierre Favre) - 3:56
"The Talking Drum" (Bruford, David Cross, Fripp, Jamie Muir, John Wetton) - 2:59
"Larks' Tongues in Aspic (Part II)" (Fripp) - 7:27
"Three of a Perfect Pair" (Belew, Bruford, Fripp, Levin) - 4:22
"VROOOM" (Belew, Bruford, Fripp, Gunn, Levin. Mastelotto) - 3:54
"Coda: Marine 475" (Belew, Bruford, Fripp, Gunn, Levin, Mastelotto) - 2:41
"Fearless and Highly THRaKked" (Belew, Bruford, Fripp, Gunn, Levin, Mastelotto) - 2:31

Personnel
Robert Fripp - guitar
Adrian Belew - guitar, vocals
Tony Levin - bass guitar, Chapman stick
Trey Gunn - Warr guitar
Bill Bruford - drums, percussion
Pat Mastelotto - drums, percussion

Produced by Robert Fripp and David Singleton.  Mixed by Adrian Belew and Ken Latchney.  Digital editing by Alex Mundy.

References

1999 live albums
King Crimson Collector's Club albums